Microzoanthus is a genus of cnidarians belonging to the monotypic family Microzoanthidae.

Species:

Microzoanthus kagerou 
Microzoanthus occultus

References

Macrocnemina
Hexacorallia genera